Nina Lykke (born 17 June 1965), is a Norwegian writer. Her literary themes include elements of dark satire mixed with humour and tragedy.

Career
Lykke made her literary debut in 2010 with the short story collection Orgien, og andre fortellinger. She followed up with the novel Oppløsningstendenser in 2013. Her novel Nei og atter nei, a family drama from 2016, was characterized as her literary breakthrough. Her novel Full spredning from 2019, earned her the Brage Prize, and became a bestseller in Norway. Subtitled "En legeroman" (A doctor's novel), the principal character "Elin", who is a physician and has been married to "Axel" for two decades, finds everything turned upside down when her ex "Bjørn" appears on Facebook. She moves into her doctor's office in an absurd cohabitation with the plastic skeleton "Tore", with whom she has unpleasant dialogues. Thematics in the novel include infidelity, dissolution of marriage, and decadence of the middle class.

References

1965 births
Living people
Norwegian women novelists
21st-century Norwegian novelists
21st-century Norwegian women writers